Obstetrics and Gynaecology (also spelled as Obstetrics and Gynecology; abbreviated as Obs and Gynae, O&G, OB-GYN and OB/GYN) is the medical specialty that encompasses the two subspecialties of obstetrics (covering pregnancy, childbirth, and the postpartum period) and gynecology (covering the health of the female reproductive system  – vagina, uterus, ovaries, and breasts).

Postgraduate training programs for both fields are usually combined, preparing the practising obstetrician-gynecologist to be adept both at the care of female reproductive organs' health and at the management of pregnancy, although many doctors go on to develop subspecialty interests in one field or the other.

Scope

United States
According to the American Board of Obstetrics and Gynecology (ABOG), which is responsible for issuing OB-GYN certifications in the United States, the first step to OB-GYN certification is completing medical school to receive an MD or DO degree. From there doctors must complete a four-year OB-GYN residency program approved by the Accreditation Council for Graduate Medical Education (ACGME). For the 2021 Electronic Residency Application Service (ERAS) match, there were 277 OB-GYN residency programs accepting applicants.

In their fourth year of residency, with an affidavit from their director to confirm program completion, OB-GYN residents can choose whether to begin the board certification process by applying to take the ABOG Qualifying Exam, which is a written test. If residents pass the Qualifying Exam, demonstrating they possess the knowledge and skills to potentially become certified OB-GYNs, they are then eligible to sit for the oral Certification Exam. Prior to the Certification Exam, residents must also gather a list of patient cases they've worked on throughout their residency in order to demonstrate their competence and experience in OB-GYN patient care.

Residents then sit for the three-hour oral exam at ABOG's test center, and if they pass the exam they become "board certified" OB-GYNs. Since 2013 at least 82% of all Certifying Exam examinees have passed.

This adds up to 11–14 years of education and practical experience. The first 7–9 years are general medical training.

Experienced OB-GYN professionals can seek certifications in sub-specialty areas, including maternal and fetal medicine. See Fellowship (medicine).

United Kingdom 
All doctors must first complete medical school and obtain a MBBS or equivalent certification. This portion typically takes five years. Following this, they are eligible for provisional registration with the General Medical Council. They then must complete a two years of foundation training. After the first year of training is complete, trainees are eligible for full registration with the General Medical Council. After the foundation training is complete applicants take the Part 1 MRCOG examination administered by the Royal College of Obstetricians and Gynaecologists. There are an additional seven years of training after this, and two more exams (Part 2 and Part 3 MRCOG exams) which adds up to nine years total minimum in training, although some trainees may take longer.

History

Subspecialties
Examples of subspecialty training available to physicians in the US are:

 Maternal-fetal medicine: an obstetrical subspecialty, sometimes referred to as perinatology, that focuses on the medical and surgical management of high-risk pregnancies and surgery on the fetus with the goal of reducing morbidity and mortality.
 Reproductive endocrinology and infertility: a subspecialty that focuses on the biological causes and interventional treatment of infertility
 Gynecological oncology: a gynaecologic subspecialty focusing on the medical and surgical treatment of women with cancers of the reproductive organs
 Female pelvic medicine and reconstructive surgery: a gynaecologic subspecialty focusing on the diagnosis and surgical treatment of women with urinary incontinence and prolapse of the pelvic organs. Sometimes referred to by laypersons as "female urology"
 Advanced laparoscopic surgery
 Family planning: a gynaecologic subspecialty offering training in contraception and pregnancy termination (abortion)
 Pediatric and adolescent gynaecology
 Menopausal and geriatric gynaecology

Of these, only the first four are truly recognized sub-specialties by the Accreditation Council for Graduate Medical Education (ACGME) and the American Board of Obstetrics and Gynecology (ABOG). The other subspecialties are recognized as informal concentrations of practice. To be recognized as a board-certified subspecialist by the American Board of Obstetrics and Gynecology or the American Osteopathic Board of Obstetrics and Gynecology, a practitioner must have completed an ACGME or AOA-accredited residency and obtained a Certificate of Added Qualifications (CAQ) which requires an additional standardized examination.

Additionally, physicians of other specialties may become trained in Advanced Life Support in Obstetrics (ALSO), a short certification that equips them to better manage emergent OB/GYN situations.

Common procedures 
There are many procedures that can be provided to people by OB/GYN's. Some procedures may include:

 Colposcopy:  If the results of a cervical cancer screening test, such as Pap smear or HPV test, are abnormal this more thorough examination of the cervix and vaginal tissues may be needed. 
 Loop electrical excision procedure (LEEP): a procedure to quickly remove abnormal vaginal tissue within the cervix. A local anesthetic and a solution to enhance the points of removal visually is administered during the process. There is a chance of experiencing watery, pinkish discharge, brownish discharge, and mild cramping. 
 Endometrial biopsy:  a procedure that collects a tissue sample from the endometrium lining of the uterus. The sample is tested and checked under a microscope for abnormals cells or indicators of cancer.   
 IUD insertion: an intrauterine device that is T-shaped and is placed in the uterus through the cervix. It is a reversible contraceptive that can be done in a doctor's office. 
 Nexplanon: is about a 4 cm implant that goes into the upper forearm. This implant releases birth control hormones into the body and can last up to three years. This type of birth control has a 99% success rate for pregnancy prevention. 
 Dilation and curettage (D&C): an out-patient procedure to open (dilate) the cervix to collect samples of endometrial tissue with a curette. A D&C can also be done to remove a fetus that was not passed naturally after a miscarriage or to induce an abortion.
Tubal ligation: a surgery to close the fallopian tubes for the prevention of pregnancy. It is also known as "tying the tubes".
Ovarian cystectomy: the removal of a cyst that either has a solid appearance, larger than three inches in diameter, has the possibility to become cancerous, or causes a constant pain. Cysts can be removed without removing an ovary. Women who do not take birth control produce small cysts every other month but they can disappear on their own.

Inclusive approaches to care 
There is no global standard, or national U.S. standard, for OB-GYN curricula, during or after residency. Hospitals and universities implement their care and provider education with different priorities in mind, some institutions focusing on following the requirements from their governing body while others go beyond the set standards to set a precedent with the care they offer.

However, the American College of Obstetrics and Gynecology (ACOG) encourages OB-GYN care providers to offer care that is inclusive to all individuals, in the context of providing a safe space for lesbian and bisexual women, and transgender and gender diverse individuals. ACOG shares this recommendation through a series of Committee Opinions, the latest of which are #525 and #823, published 2012 and 2021 respectively. ACOG's first comment on the need for LGBTQ+ inclusive care from OB-GYNs came in 2011 through Committee Opinion #512, "Healthcare for Transgender Individuals", which has since been withdrawn and replaced by 2021 opinion #823.

ACOG recommends that OB-GYNs should:

 Be a resource for both patients and families with health-oriented information on sexual orientation and gender issues
 Provide gender-affirming surgeries if possible, and treat these procedures as medically necessary for patients with gender dysphoria
 In the process of gender transition, fertility and parenting desires should be discussed early on, and patients should be offered all available information
 Preventative screening procedures should be offered based on anatomical structures present, not gender identity
 Create a structurally inclusive environment by making their offices "inviting to all individuals who need obstetric or gynecologic health care"
 Educate all care providers and office personnel about LGBTQ+ health, including the use of inclusive language and the unique needs of LGBTQ+ patients
 Post a nondiscrimination policy for the office in the reception area
 Offer comprehensive patient education specific to LGBTQ+ individuals, like clarifying that gender hormone therapy is not a form of birth control

The need for LGBTQ+ affirming OB-GYNs 
Transgender, nonbinary people, and lesbian or bisexual women frequently face additional challenges—including structural and overt discrimination, accessing insurance coverage stigma, and cisnormativity—when attempting to access gynecologic and reproductive healthcare services and providers. Obstetrics and gynecology is a field thought of as traditionally serving women because of its focus on the female reproductive system, leading care providers to make assumptions about patients' gender identity and expression in "women's health clinics" when many transgender or nonbinary patients may also seek care from OB-GYNs. Additionally, LGBTQ+ patients are at risk for and experience unique health conditions which care providers may not be prepared to address—i.e. the providers lack cultural competence—without LGBTQ+ specific healthcare training.

Interactions with care providers who are not prepared or knowledgeable enough to offer comprehensive and effective care can compound the "negative and traumatic experiences that many nonbinary and transgender people have had when accessing care", and drive them away from seeking necessary healthcare in the future. Even if transgender or nonbinary patients have not had a personally negative of traumatic experience, collective trauma can also play into a fear of medical settings and providers. This results in nearly 25% of transgender or nonbinary people reporting avoidance of healthcare services out of fear of being mistreated for their gender. Care typically offered by OB-GYNs, like pelvic exams and procedures, can be "particularly difficult or traumatic" for transgender and nonbinary patients, which the provider can offset by engaging a trauma-informed care approach to exams.

More research is gradually being done to establish the need for an LGBTQ+ healthcare curriculum for all medical students, residents, and doctors. Multiple researchers have also suggested that obstetrics & gynecology is the ideal field for this education to initially be implemented, since the nature of OB-GYN work ties it more directly to gender than other medical specialties. OB-GYNs also historically have more cultural competency training around gender based issues.

Some common services LGBTQ+ folks may seek from OB-GYNs include:

 Preventive services such as PAP smears
 Contraceptive counseling
 Treatment for gynecologic conditions
 Support for family planning
 Risk/harm reduction
 Gender affirming surgeries like hysterectomies and oophorectomies

If providers are not educated on LGBTQ+ healthcare they will not be aware of some of the health risks LGBTQ+ patients may be more vulnerable too, placing their patients at greater risk. Common chronic diseases the LGBTQ+ population is at risk for:

 Chronic anovulation and polycystic ovarian syndrome
 Sexually transmitted infections including human papilloma virus (HPV) and human immunodeficiency virus (HIV) infections
 Intimate partner violence
 Substance abuse
 Cancer (anal, breast, cervical, colon, endometrial and oropharyngeal)

Teaching LGBTQ+ healthcare 
Most OB-GYN programs have a flexible curriculum that offers learning in a variety of contexts, including small group discussions, case study discussions, and structured patient exams. The multifaceted nature of this teaching structure makes it easier for programs to begin initiating LGBTQ+ healthcare instruction in informal voluntary contexts, while simultaneously advocating for long-term structural change that would incorporate LGBTQ+ healthcare into all OB-GYN and medical school curricula.

When initially instituting an LGBTQ+ healthcare curricula for OB-GYN residents or professionals, the Association of Professors of Gynecology and Obstetrics' (APGO) Undergraduate Medical Education Committee (UMEC) recommends that topics like patient education, screening standards, and common chronic diseases in the LGBTQ+ population are prioritized to ensure comprehensive and effective care for LGBTQ+ patients.

In residency 
APGO's UMCE poses that academic health centers are in an ideal position to drive the "curricular change that is needed to remove health disparities" for all patient populations in the LGBTQ+ community.

Although not a requirement within the ACGME's standards for American OB-GYN residency programs curriculum, LGBTQ+ healthcare education is established in some OB-GYN residency programs throughout America. A web-based survey of approximately 100 Illinois OB-GYN residents a survey study found that 62% of their programs had spent 1-5 hours in the past year educating residents about lesbian and bisexual health, and 63% of the their programs had spent 1-5 hours in the past year educating residents about transgender health.

APGO's UMEC identifies the third year of residency or "clerkship" as an ideal time to institute education if it hasn't already occurred, and ideally to reinforce competencies with LGBTQ+ patients through clinical experiences.

Established OB-GYNs 
In addition to instituting new educational policies for current and future OB-GYN residents, many programs are also looking to educate OB-GYNs that are already certified.

For example, the University of Michigan OB-GYN program utilizes what they name "Continuing Medical Education" to instruct their OB-GYN care providers on the nuances of caring for transgender patients. Daphna Strousma, MD, MPH, is responsible for instituting and developing UM's transgender healthcare curriculum—"Improving Care for Transgender & Non-Binary Individuals"—in coordination with Michigan Medicine and the Council on Resident Education in Obstetrics and Gynecology (CREOG). The curriculum is offered to UM's OB-GYNs through a series of video modules covering the following topics:

 Gender Identity and Care of Transgender and Gender Non-Conforming Patients
 Preventative Care for Transgender and Gender Non-Conforming Patients
 Gender Affirming Treatment & Transition Related Care
 Addressing Common Gynecologic Issues Among Transgender Patients
 Health Records, Billing, Insurance, and Legal Documents in Transgender Medicine

Challenges to instituting inclusive care 
Although the ACOG has called upon OB-GYN care providers to provide gender-affirming and inclusive care for all individuals, that doesn't mean there hasn't been resistance, particularly because there is no formal legislation mandating the inclusion of LGBTQ+ healthcare in OB-GYN curricula.

Many OB-GYN providers do not currently feel comfortable offering care to LGBTQ+ patients, either because of their personal beliefs or due to a lack of education on LGBTQ+ healthcare. One study of approximately 100 Illinois OB-GYN residents found that 50% of residents felt unprepared to care for lesbian or bisexual patients, and 76% of residents felt unprepared to offer care to transgender patients. The two main areas the residents identified as preventing the implementation of LGBTQ+ healthcare training were curricular crowding, 85%, and lack of experienced faculty, 91%. However, 92% of residents wanted to receive more education on how to offer care to LGBTQ+ patients.

See also 
 Theriogenology
 Andrology
 Urology
 Neonatal infection

Footnotes

References

Bibliography

Further reading

External links 
 www.figo.org International Federation of Gynaecology and Obstetrics (FIGO)
 BJOG: An International Journal of Obstetricians and Gynecologists
 World Congress on Controversies in Obstetrics, Gynecology & Infertility (COGI)

Obstetrics
Gynaecology